Lestoidea conjuncta is a species of Australian damselfly in the family Lestoideidae,
known as a common  bluestreak. 
It is endemic to coastal north-east Queensland, where it inhabits streams in rainforest.

Lestoidea conjuncta is a medium-sized to large damselfly, dark coloured with dull orange to greenish markings.

Gallery

See also
 List of Odonata species of Australia

References 

Lestoideidae
Odonata of Australia
Insects of Australia
Endemic fauna of Australia
Taxa named by Robert John Tillyard
Insects described in 1913
Damselflies